Selfie (stylized as #selfie) is a 2014 Romanian teen comedy film directed by Cristina Jacob and produced by Zazu Film. The plot revolves around three 18-year-old girls (played by Crina Semciuc, Flavia Hojda and Olimpia Melinte) who decide to spend their last days before the final exam on a trip to the beach, rather than keep studying. The film is catching attention upon the selfie phenomenon, famous among the young generation in 2014. The action of the movie is immortalising the protagonists using their mobile phones and posting selfie photos and videos on social media.

Plot 
 
Yasmine, Roxi and Ana are willing to have fun and forget about the stress of the last 2 days before the Baccalaureate exam. For them, having fun means a final big adventure, breaking the rules and never thinking about any possible consequences. In their seek for freedom, love and adrenaline they meet three young men they hang out with at sea.

Cast 

 Crina Semciuc as Yasmine Necsulescu
 Flavia Hojda as Ana Ceausu
 Olimpia Melinte as Roxana Popa
 Alex Calin as Bogdan
 Levent Sali as Mihai
 Vlad Logigan as George
 Alina Chivulescu as Cecilia Popa
 Razvan Vasilescu as Nicu Ceausu

Rest of cast (listed alphabetically) 
 Florin Calinescu as Policeman 1
 Catalin Catoiu as Clementin
 Dan Chisu as Yasmine's Father
 Bogdan Cotlet as Policeman 2
 Anghel Damian as Rares
 Constantin Florescu as Math Teacher
 Razvan Fodor as Sergiu
 Ion Grosu as Policeman 3
 Nicoleta Luciu as Segiu's friend
 Titi Radoaie as Driver
 Mihaela Rădulescu as Yasmine's Mother
 Mihai Rait Dragomir as Gas station cashier 
 James Simenc as George (Magi) (voice)
 Smiley as Pepenar 1
 Carmen Tanase as Biology Teacher
 Catalin Radu Tanase as Reporter
 Alex Velea as Pepenar 2
 George Vintila as Station Employee

Production

#Selfie (2014) marks Cristina Jacob’s directorial debut. The cast is a mix of young actors and well-known Romanian actors. #Selfie’s script writing involved another two screenwriters in addition to Cristina Jacob: Maria Spirache and Alexandru Molico. #Selfie is a MediaPro Pictures and Zazu Film production.

Filming 

#Selfie production was a process of 27 days, in 12 different locations and 68 professionals involved. 10 cameras were used to create an impressive stunt and nine stuntmen performed the scenes in which a car plunged into the waters of the Black Sea. The whole scene was filmed "from a single double".

Music 

The soundtrack of the film is signed by Hahaha Production. One of the composers is Smiley - on his real name Andrei Maria Tiberiu. Smiley can also be seen in the film, performing the role of a watermelon seller from Vama Veche, together with Alex Velea.

Reception 

With over $355.000 and 86.000 admissions in Box Office, 1.100.000 views on Tv, 12 Film festival selections and 7 awards,Selfie was the highest-grossing Romanian film of 2014 in its country. For this reason it won the Public Prize at the 2015 Gopo Awards, being also nominated for other four categories. A sequel titled Selfie 69, also directed by Jacob, was released in 2016.

References

External links 
 

2014 films
2014 comedy films
2010s teen comedy films
Romanian comedy films
2010s Romanian-language films
Films directed by Cristina Jacob